Henry Alexander "Bert" Rapiport (30 September 1865 – 30 December 1913) was an Australian rules footballer who played for the Fitzroy Football Club in the Victorian Football League (VFL) and South Adelaide and West Adelaide Football Clubs in the South Australian Football Association (SAFA).

In 2015, it was discovered that Rapiport was Jewish, making him the first and one of few Jews to have played senior VFL/AFL football.

References

Sources
Holmesby, Russell & Main, Jim (2009). The Encyclopedia of AFL Footballers. 8th ed. Melbourne: Bas Publishing.

External links

1865 births
1913 deaths
Australian rules footballers from Melbourne
Fitzroy Football Club players
South Adelaide Football Club players
West Adelaide Football Club players
Jewish sportspeople
Australian Jews